Lunga District is one of the newly created districts in the Luapula Province of Zambia. It was declared a district in 2012 by Michael Sata (by splitting Samfya District). The district comprises archipelago of islands in the Bangweulu Wetlands in the South East of Lake Bangweulu.

Education
Lunga district has nineteen learning institutions. Thirteen primary schools, five community schools and one private school. - Lunga DEBS

Major Tourist Attraction
The Bangweulu wetlands in Lunga District are expansive clear water wetlands in the South east of Lake Bangweulu. The Bangweulu are renowned to be the haven for numerous avian species and other wild life species. Unique to the wetlands are the beautiful Black Lechwe and the Shoebill Stock.

The Unga speaking people of Lunga District depend on cassava mostly and fishing is their main source of income.

References

Districts of Luapula Province